Chlorodiella is a genus of crabs in the family Xanthidae, containing the following species:

Chlorodiella barbata (Borradaile, 1900)
Chlorodiella corallicola Miyake & Takeda, 1968
Chlorodiella crispipleopa Dai, Yang, Song & Chen, 1986
Chlorodiella cytherea (Dana, 1852)
Chlorodiella davaoensis Ward, 1941
Chlorodiella laevissima (Dana, 1852)
Chlorodiella longimana (H. Milne-Edwards, 1834)
Chlorodiella nigra (Forskål, 1775)
Chlorodiella ohshimai Miyake & Takeda, 1967
Chlorodiella quadrilobata Dai, Cai & Yang, 1996
Chlorodiella spinimera Dai, Cai & Yang, 1996
Chlorodiella xishaensis Chen & Lan, 1978

References

Xanthoidea
Taxa named by Mary J. Rathbun